The Idrisid dirham was a silver coin minted under the Idrisid dynasty in Morocco and the western Maghreb.

Name 
The word "dirham" comes from drachma (δραχμή), the Greek coin. "Dirham" is also the name of the currency in use in Morocco today. Idris I was the founder of the Idrisid dynasty.

History 
They were first struck under Idris I (788–791) in Tudgha and Volubilis. Ultimately, they were minted at approximately 20 different workshops.

Description 
Inscriptions on the coins indicate the dynasty's Zaidiyyah Shia alignment. They promoted the dynasty's lineage tracing back to Ali, which gave the dynasty legitimacy. The Iraqi Kufic script on these coins influenced the early development of Maghrebi script. The Kufic script on these coins is basic and unembellished, reflecting the economic status of the Idrisid state.

Use 
Idrisid dirhams circulated widely in the Middle East, and have been found as far as Russia and the Balkans.

References 

Silver coins
Idrisid dynasty
Islamic banking
Currencies of Morocco
Coins of Morocco
Coins of the medieval Islamic world